ISSP can refer to:

 International Society of Sustainability Professionals (ISSP), non-profit professional association
 Integrated Single Specialty Provider, health care business model
 Integrated Soldier System Project, future soldier project in Canada
 International Social Survey Programme, a collaboration between different nations conducting surveys covering topics which are useful for social science research
 In-school suspension, an alternative setting that removes students from the classroom for a period of time, while requiring students to attend school and complete their work
 Institute for Science, Society and Policy, a multi-disciplinary unit at the University of Ottawa, Canada
 Inter-Solar System Police, a fictional police agency from the anime Cowboy Bebop
 In System Serial Programming, a microcontroller programming standard
 Information Society Service Providers under the EU Electronic Commerce Directive
 Information Systems Strategy Plan 
 The Institute for Solid State Physics (ISSP), The University of Tokyo